"Merry Christmas, Mr. Lawrence" is a 1983 instrumental by Japanese composer Ryuichi Sakamoto recorded for the film of the same name. The song has become a staple of Christmas music in the USA, Britain and Japan. A vocal version, "Forbidden Colours", features former Japan frontman David Sylvian and charted in the top 20 of the UK Singles Chart and Irish Singles Chart.

Charts

Watergate version
In 1999, a remix of Sakamoto's "Merry Christmas Mr. Lawrence" titled "Heart of Asia" was released in Europe by German-Turkish disc jockey DJ Quicksilver, under the alias Watergate. This version was a success, reaching number three on the UK Singles Chart and number four in Denmark.

Charts

Weekly charts

Year-end charts

Other versions
There is a 12-inch vinyl Italo disco cover version on the Italian record label Discomagic named "Clock on 5 – Theme from Furyo" which was released in 1984. In 2004, Croatian pianist Maksim Mrvica included a piano remix of "Merry Christmas, Mr. Lawrence" on his third album, Variations Part I&II. Japanese-American R&B artist Hikaru Utada heavily sampled the theme for her 2009 song "Merry Christmas Mr. Lawrence – FYI", from the album This Is the One.

In 2008, a cover version of "Forbidden Colours" was included on Hollywood Mon Amour, a collection of songs from soundtracks of movies made in the 1980s, rearranged by Marc Collin of Nouvelle Vague with Nadeah Miranda providing the vocals. Also in 2008, UK Hardcore producer Orbit1 remixed the song and called it "Heart of Asia" – named after the 2000 Watergate remix. It came out on the Hardcore Nation 2009. In 2009, British singer Faryl Smith recorded a version of the song for her album Wonderland, entitled "Merry Christmas Mr Lawrence (Somewhere Far Away)".

Part of the song is also pastiched in the theme song to the video game International Karate, written by Rob Hubbard. Japanese post-hardcore band Fact recorded a track by the title "Merry Christmas, Mr. Lawrence" on their self-titled album. Tokyo Brass Style, a Japanese big band, recorded a cover of the title theme for their fifth album, Brass Style Xmas. Sherwood & Pinch released a version of the song on their 2017 LP Man vs Sofa.

Influence
Peter Buck, guitarist for R.E.M., has credited the film's theme song as an inspiration for the mandolin part he composed for the band's hit song "Losing My Religion".

References

1983 compositions
Songs written by Ryuichi Sakamoto
New-age songs
Synth-pop songs
Japanese Christmas songs
Ryuichi Sakamoto songs
Japanese film songs